West Teke is a Bantu language spoken in the Republic of Congo and Gabon.

West Teke is a dialect continuum. The varieties are Tsaayi (Ge-Tsaya, Tyaye, Tsayi), Laali, Yaa (Yaka), and Tyee (Tee, Kwe). The dominant variety by far is Tsaayi.

References

Languages of Gabon
Nzebi languages
Teke languages